Saud bin Faisal may refer to:

Saud bin Faisal bin Turki, ruler of the Second Saudi State in 1871 and between 1873 and 1875 
Saud bin Faisal bin Abdulaziz, foreign minister of Saudi Arabia between 1975 and 2015